Laura “Laila” Annikki Kinnunen (8 November 1939, Vantaa – 26 October 2000, Heinävesi) was a Finnish singer. She was one of the most popular Finnish singers of the 1950s and 1960s, and represented Finland at the 1961 Eurovision Song Contest, the first time Finland participated in the contest.

She spent her childhood in Sweden as a refugee from the Second World War, returning to Finland at the age of ten. Her first album, released in 1957, was a success, and she continued to release music until 1980. From the 1970s she suffered from severe alcoholism.

Her daughter is Finnish singer Milana Mišić.

Albums 
 Laila (1965, Scandia)
 Iskelmiä vuosien varrelta (1974, Scandia)
 Ajaton Laila Kinnunen (1974, Scandia)
 Sävelkansio (1980, Hjgitjelmi)
 Valoa ikkunassa (1986, Helmi)
 32 ikivihreää (1989, Safir)
 24 ikivihreää (1989, Finnlevy)
 Mandschurian kummut (1989, Basebeat)
 Unohtumattomat (1992, Helmi)
 Parhaat (1994, Valitut Palat)
 20 suosikkia – Lazzarella (1996, F Records)
 20 suosikkia – Valoa ikkunassa (1996, F Records)
 20 suosikkia – Mandshurian kummut (1997, F Records)
 20 suosikkia – Idän ja lännen tiet (1997, F Records)
 Muistojen Laila (1999, F Records)
 Kaikki kauneimmat (2000, F Records)
 Muistojen kyyneleet: 20 ennen julkaisematonta laulua (2001, Mediamusiikki)
 Kadonneet helmet: 20 ennenjulkaisematonta laulua (2002, Mediamusiikki)
 Kadonneet helmet 2: 20 ennenjulkaisematonta laulua (2004, Mediamusiikki)
 30 suosikkia (2007, Warner Music)
 A la Laila: Alkuperäiset levytykset 1957-1980 (2009, Warner Music)

See also
Annikki Tähti

References

External links
 Laila Kinnunen at Pomus.net.

1939 births
2000 deaths
People from Vantaa
Eurovision Song Contest entrants of 1961
Eurovision Song Contest entrants for Finland
20th-century Finnish women singers
Refugees in Sweden
Finnish refugees